Maelyn Jarmon (born December 8, 1992) is an American folk singer. She is the winner of season 16 of the American talent competition The Voice at the age of 26.  After winning the show, she was signed to Republic Records.

Career
In 2019, Maelyn Jarmon entered the sixteenth season of The Voice. For her blind audition, she sang "Fields of Gold" by Sting. Adam Levine, John Legend, Kelly Clarkson and Blake Shelton turned, and she chose to be a part of Team Legend. She made it to the finale and was announced as the winner on May 21, 2019. On July 4, 2019, she sang the national anthem at A Capitol Fourth.

Personal life
Maelyn grew up in Frisco, TX and lived in NYC for 9 years before receiving an invitation to audition for Season 16 of The Voice.

The Voice (2019)

 – Studio version of performance was the most streamed song on Apple Music

The Voice performances

Discography

Extended plays

Singles

References

External links
 - (February 25, 2019)
 - (May 20, 2019)

1992 births
Living people
People from Frisco, Texas
Republic Records artists
Singers from Texas
The Voice (franchise) winners
Universal Music Group artists
21st-century American singers
21st-century American women singers